Connecticut's 111th House of Representatives district elects one member of the Connecticut House of Representatives. It encompasses parts of Ridgefield and has been represented by Democrat Aimee Berger-Girvalo.

List of representatives

Recent elections

2020

2018

2016

2014

2012

References

111